Michelle Louise Lynch (born 16 October 1975) is a New Zealand former cricketer who played as a right-handed batter, and occasional wicket-keeper. She appeared in 6 One Day Internationals for New Zealand in 2003. She played domestic cricket for Auckland, and captained them during the 2002–03 season.

References

External links

Living people
1975 births
Cricketers from Auckland
New Zealand women cricketers
New Zealand women One Day International cricketers
Auckland Hearts cricketers